L/D may refer to:
Learning and development, in human resource management
Lift-to-drag ratio, in aerodynamics
Lincoln–Douglas debates, a series of seven debates in 1858 between Abraham Lincoln, the Republican candidate for the Senate in Illinois, and Senator Stephen Douglas, the Democratic Party candidate

See also
 DL (disambiguation) 
 LD (disambiguation)